Marion Brooks "Pat" Tobin (January 28, 1916 – January 21, 1975) was a Major League Baseball pitcher who played in  with the Philadelphia Athletics.

External links

1916 births
1975 deaths
Major League Baseball pitchers
Baseball players from Arkansas
Philadelphia Athletics players